Matara ( Mātara distrikkaya;  Māttaṛai māvaṭṭam) is a district in Southern Province, Sri Lanka. It is one of 25 districts of Sri Lanka, the second level administrative division of the country. The district is administered by a District Secretariat headed by a District Secretary (previously known as a Government Agent) appointed by the central government of Sri Lanka.

Geography

It is represented in the Sri Lankan Parliament following the 2010 Sri Lankan parliamentary election by former Sri Lankan national Cricketer Sanath Jayasuriya who stood for the United People's Freedom Alliance.

Administrative units
Matara District is divided into 16 Divisional Secretary's Division (DS Divisions), each headed by a Divisional Secretary (previously known as an Assistant Government Agent). The DS Divisions are further sub-divided into 650 Grama Niladhari Divisions (GN Divisions), with 1,658 villages.

Major cities 

 Matara (Municipal Council)

Other towns 

 Aparekka
 Weligama (Weligama Urban Council)
 Akuressa
 Tihagoda
 Mirissa
 Deniyaya
 Pitabeddara
 Kamburupitiya
 Thelijjawila
 Malimbada
 Welipitiya
 Denipitiya
 Welihinda
 Morawaka
 Nupe
 Devinuwara
 Gandara
 Hakmana
 Karaputugala

Demographics

Population
Matara District's population was 803,999 in 2012. The majority of the population are Sinhalese, with a minority Sri Lankan Moor and Indian Tamil population.

Ethnicity

Religion

Notes

References

External links
 

 
Districts of Sri Lanka